St. Paul's Church is an Episcopal Church in Dedham, Massachusetts

History
A group of Anglicans began meeting in Clapboardtrees in 1731. A chapel was built with a bequest from George E. Hutton. , it is a nursery school.

Lay readers from the church began ministering to Episcopalians in the Oakdale section of town in 1873 who could not get to the church easily. Out of their efforts grew the Church of the Good Shepard, which was dedicated in 1876. One of the early members was William B. Gould.

Colburn grant
Samuel Colburn died in the Crown Point Expedition of 1756. Though he was not an Anglican, he left almost his entire estate to the Anglican community in Dedham to establish St. Paul's Church. The grant, consisting of 135 acres of land and other cash and property, was hindered only by a life estate left to his mother. Some of the eight parcels were on the outskirts of town, along Mother Brook or up in Sandy Valley, but most were centered around modern day Dedham Square. The main portion ran from Maple Place to Dwight's Brook, and 10 acres bounded by High, Court, and School streets.

When Colburn's mother died in 1792, Montague began laying out streets and house lots on the property. The first street Montague laid out, modern day Church Street, was the first street in Dedham to be laid out with house lots on either side, as opposed to simply being a road to connect one farm to another. Norfolk Street was next, followed by School street. Montague rented out the parcels in 999 year leases. One lessee, Samuel Richards, hired Charles Bulfinch to design his house on the corner of Highland and Court Streets.

Music
William H. Mann was the  organist in both the 1797 church and in the 1845 church until it burned down. John H.B. Thayer then left the brand new organ at the Allin Congregational Church in 1858 to play at St. Paul's. He held the position until his death in 1873.

Churches

1758 building
The first church, a simply structure measuring 30' by 40', was built on Court Street in 1758 diagonally across from where the current church stands. It was built by a Mr. Durpee. When the main beam of the church was raised, it broke causing 12 men to fall. None were injured. It was dedicated in 1761, but it wasn't complete until 1771 when it was plastered and permanent seats were installed. When Norfolk County was established in 1792, the congregation offered their building for use of the courts, but it was in such poor condition that the county declined.

The people of Dedham stoned the church during the American Revolution and then took it over for use as a military storehouse. From then on, Rev. William Clark would secretly conduct services in his house.

1797 building
The congregation attempted to move the church to Franklin Square in 1797, but the entire structure collapsed, sending a cauldron of bats out of the belfry. It was reconstructed in that location in 1798 using various portions of an abandoned church in Stoughton.

In 1845, Comfort Weatherbee was commissioned to demolish the church. All the boarding was removed and a capstan was used to pull the frame and tower down.

1845 building
The builders of the 1845 church, Thomas and Nathan Phillips, were from Dedham. Designed by Arthur Gilman after Magdalen College, Oxford, it was consecrated on Court Street in 1845 but burned down in 1856. The bell from the 1797 church hung in the tower for three or four years, but was eventually replaced with a rich toned bell. The old bell, which was small enough for neighborhood boys to pick up and chime, was then placed on the ground next to the tower for a few weeks before removal.

1858 building
The present church was built in 1858 at the corner of Court Street and Village Ave. It was 90' long and the bell tower, added in 1869, was 100' high  The bell was donated by Ira Cleveland.

Ministers

The first minister, Rev. William Clark, held controversial Tory views. By March of 1777, Clark announced that he would cease preaching; such an action was easier to swallow than eliminating prayers for the king. Two months later, he was charged by the Board of Selectmen in Dedham of being a traitor to the American Revolution. 

After being denied bail, he was brought to Boston to stand before a military tribunal. He refused to pledge allegiance to the Commonwealth, and so was sent onto a prison ship for 10 weeks. In June 1778, Fisher Ames obtained a pass for him and Clark was allowed to leave America.

In 1791, the congregation regrouped and called William Montague away from Old North Church. Montague received a salary of £100 sterling. He remained in the Dedham church until 1818.

Samuel B. Babcock served as rector in three buildings from 1834 to 1873.

Notes

References

Works cited

Churches in Dedham, Massachusetts
1845 establishments in Massachusetts
1798 establishments in Massachusetts
1758 establishments in Massachusetts
Episcopal church buildings in Massachusetts
History of Dedham, Massachusetts